The 1971–72 Scottish Second Division was won by Dumbarton who, along with second placed Arbroath, were promoted to the First Division. Hamilton Academical finished bottom.

Table

References 

 Scottish Football Archive

Scottish Division Two seasons
2
Scot